Tumidiclava  is a wasp genus in the family Trichogrammatidae.

References

External links 

Trichogrammatidae